Gilbert River may refer to:
 Gilbert River (Queensland), a river in northern Australia
 Gilbert River, Queensland, a rural locality in northern Australia
 Gilbert River (South Australia), Australia
 Gilbert River (Labrador), Canada; see List of rivers of Newfoundland and Labrador
 Gilbert River (Cyriac River), Canada
 Gilbert River (Beauce-Sartigan), Quebec, Canada; see List of rivers of Quebec
 Gilbert River (Oregon), United States